The Parisii (Gaulish: Parisioi) were a Gallic tribe that dwelt on the banks of the river Seine during the Iron Age and the Roman era. They lived on lands now occupied by the modern city of Paris, whose name is derived from the ethnonym.

Name 
They are mentioned as Parisii by Caesar (mid-1st c. BC), Parísioi (Παρίσιοι; var. Παρήσιοι) by Strabo (early 1st c. AD) and Ptolemy (2nd c. AD), Parisi by Pliny (mid-1st c. AD), and as Parisius and Parisios in the Notitia Dignitatum (5th c. AD). Another tribe named Parisii is also documented in Britain.

The ethnic name Parisii is a latinized form of Gaulish Parisioi (sing. Parisios). Its meaning has been debated. According to Xavier Delamarre, it may derive from the stem pario- ('cauldron'). Alfred Holder interpreted the name as 'the makers' or 'the commanders', by comparing it to the Welsh peryff ('lord, commander'), both possibly descending from a Proto-Celtic form reconstructed as *kwar-is-io-. Alternatively, Pierre-Yves Lambert proposed to translate Parisii as the 'spear people', by connecting the first element to the Old Irish carr 'spear', derived from an earlier *kwar-sā.

The city of Paris, attested as Lutetiam Oppidum Parisiorum by Caesar (Parision in the 5th c. AD, Paris in 1265), is named after the Gallic tribe.

History
The Parisii settled in the territory surrounding their chief town (or oppidum) about 250 BC, as first mentioned in Julius Caesar's Commentarii de Bello Gallico.

According to the Commentarii de Bello Gallico, when the Romans under Caesar entered this territory, the Parisii started burning down their own towns for they were willing to give up these possessions rather than have them taken by the Romans.

In 52 BC, in concert with the Suessiones, the Parisii participated in the general rising of Vercingetorix against Julius Caesar. Before the Roman period, the Parisii had their own gold coinage.

Once part of the Roman Empire the Parisii oppidum later became the site of Lutetia, an important city in the Roman province of Gallia Lugdunensis, and ultimately the modern city of Paris, whose name is derived from the name of the tribe. An ancient trade route between Germania and Hispania existed at the area, by way of the meeting of the Oise and Marne rivers with the Seine.

See also
 Iron Age of North Europe
 List of peoples of Gaul
 Paris
 Parisi (Yorkshire), tribe of similar name in East Yorkshire, UK
Treasure of Puteaux, Gallic coins discovered at Puteaux, Hauts-de-Seine, France and most of the coins are from the Parisii tribe.

References

Bibliography

Further reading

External links
 

Historical Celtic peoples
Gauls
History of Paris
Tribes of pre-Roman Gaul
Tribes involved in the Gallic Wars